Yesin van der Pluijm (born 4 April 1999) is a Dutch professional footballer who plays as a midfielder for One Knoxville SC in USL League One.

Career

Youth
Van der Pluijm, raised in Rotterdam, joined local side Feyenoord when he was seven year's old. After almost a decade with the club, he left the club and joined Excelsior, where he captained the U19 side in his first season.

College and amateur
In 2018, Van der Pluijm moved to the United States to play college soccer at Young Harris College. Over three seasons with the Mountain Lions, he made 54 appearances, scoring four goals and tallying three assists. In 2019 he was named to the United Soccer Coaches NCAA Division II All-Southeast Region second team, CoSIDA Academic All-District III Men's Soccer Team, the All-Peach Belt Conference second team, and the Peach Belt Conference Men's Soccer Team of Academic Distinction.

In 2019, Van der Pluijm played in the USL League Two with Cincinnati Dutch Lions, where he scored a single goal in 11 appearances.

Professional
On 17 December 2021, it was announced that Van der Pluijm would join USL Championship side Colorado Springs Switchbacks ahead of their 2022 season. He made his professional debut on 26 March 2022, appearing as a 90th–minute substitute in a 2–0 win over Birmingham Legion.

Van der Pluijm joined USL League One expansion club One Knoxville SC on 15 December 2022. The move reunites van der Pluijm and his college coach, Mark McKeever.

References

External links
Young Harris bio

1999 births
Association football midfielders
Cincinnati Dutch Lions players
Colorado Springs Switchbacks FC players
Dutch expatriate footballers
Dutch expatriate sportspeople in the United States
Dutch footballers
Excelsior Rotterdam players
Expatriate soccer players in the United States
Feyenoord players
Footballers from Rotterdam
Living people
People from Rotterdam
USL Championship players
USL League Two players
Young Harris Mountain Lions men's soccer players
One Knoxville SC players